Lizardo Bus Lines is a bus line in the Philippines. The bus line are both using aircon and ordinary buses for their routes.

Terminal
 Slaughterhouse Compound, Baguio
 Dangwa Bus Terminal, Baguio

Destinations
 Sagada, Mountain Province
 Bontoc, Mountain Province
 Tabuk City, Kalinga
 Maria Aurora, Aurora
 Baler, Aurora
 Maddela, Quirino
 Sadanga, Mountain Province
 Bauko, Mountain Province

References

Bus companies of the Philippines
Companies based in Baguio